Borgmann Mill was a historic grist mill located near Marthasville, Warren County, Missouri.  It was built between 1847 and 1850, and was a 1 1/2-story, timber frame building.  The mill was powered by mule teams or oxen.  At its listing it was the only "barley huller and corn grinder" constructed entirely of wood left in Missouri or the Middle West.

It was listed on the National Register of Historic Places in 1970 and delisted in 1994.

References

Former National Register of Historic Places in Missouri
Grinding mills on the National Register of Historic Places in Missouri
Industrial buildings completed in 1850
Buildings and structures in Warren County, Missouri
National Register of Historic Places in Warren County, Missouri